The 2011 World Table Tennis Championships women's doubles was the 50th edition of the women's doubles championship. Guo Yue and Li Xiaoxia won the title in 2009. They successfully defended their title by defeating Ding Ning and Guo Yan in the final 11–8, 11–5, 13–11, 11–8.

Seeds
Matches will be best of 5 games in qualification matches and best of 7 games in the 64-player sized main draw.

  Guo Yue /  Li Xiaoxia (world champions)
  Ding Ning /  Guo Yan (final)
  Kim Kyung-Ah /  Park Mi-Young (semifinals)
  Jiang Huajun /  Tie Ya Na (semifinals)
  Ai Fukuhara /  Kasumi Ishikawa (third round)
  Lee Eun-Hee /  Park Young-Sook (third round, disqualified)
  Hiroko Fujii /  Misako Wakamiya (quarterfinals)
  Li Jiawei /  Sun Beibei (quarterfinals)
  Feng Tianwei /  Wang Yuegu (third round)
  Feng Yalan /  Mu Zi (quarterfinals)
  Yuka Ishigaki /  Yuri Yamanashi (third round)
  Cheng I-ching /  Huang Yi-hua (third round)
  Kim Hye-Song /  Kim Jong (quarterfinals)
  Seok Ha-Jung /  Yang Ha-Eun (second round)
  Daniela Dodean /  Elizabeta Samara (third round)
  Georgina Póta /  Krisztina Tóth (second round)
  Shen Yanfei /  Zhu Fang (second round)
  Li Jiao /  Li Jie (third round)
  Zhenqi Barthel /  Kristin Silbereisen (second round)
  Sirin He /  Melek Hu (second round)
  Renata Strbikova /  Iveta Vacenovska (second round)
  Sabine Winter /  Wu Jiaduo (second round)
  Lee Ho Ching /  Yu Kwok See (second round)
  Oxana Fadeeva /  Anna Tikhomirova (second round)
  Alena Dubkova /  Viktoria Pavlovich (second round)
  Galia Dvorak /  Sara Ramirez (third round)
  Anamaria Erdelji /  Gabriela Feher (first round)
  Polina Mikhaylova /  Yana Noskova (second round)
  Guan Meng Yuan /  Ng Wing Nam (second round)
  Veronika Pavlovich /  Alexandra Privalova (first round)
  Katarzyna Grzybowska /  Natalia Partyka (second round)
  Barbora Balazova /  Eva Ódorová (first round)

Draw

Finals

Top half

Section 1

Section 2

Bottom half

Section 3

Section 4

See also
List of World Table Tennis Championships medalists

References

External links
Main Draw

-
World